Ian Kenny may refer to:

 Ian Kenny (rugby union), rugby union referee
 Ian Kenny (hurler), Irish hurler
 Ian Kenny, the lead vocalist of Birds of Tokyo and Karnivool